This is a list of notable converts from Zoroastrianism to the Islamic faith.

 Abu'l Hasan Mihyar al-Daylami - Persian poet from Daylam.
 Abdullah Ibn al-Muqaffa - author and translator of Kalīla wa Dimna from Middle Persian.
 Abu-Mansur Daqiqi - Persian poet.
 Saman Khuda - forefather of the Samanid dynasty, one of the first native Persian dynasties in the Middle East and Central Asia after the collapse of the Sassanids.
 Naubakht - Pahlavi translator of the Abbasid court.
 Fadl ibn Sahl - Persian vizier of the Abbasid era.
Rattanbai Jinnah - Wife of Muhammad Ali Jinnah

References

 
Islam from Zoroastrianism